The Purdue Boilermakers, a college football team based in Indiana, has competed every season since 1889. The team has played in the Indiana Intercollegiate Athletic Association, the Western Conference and the Big Ten Conference. The team last won a conference title in 2000.

Seasons

References

Purdue
 
Purdue Boilermakers football seasons